BSCC may refer to:

 Bay State Correctional Center, a defunct small, general population medium security facility in Norfolk, Massachusetts
 Bevill State Community College, a public community college in Sumiton, Alabama
 Big Spring Correctional Center, a privately operated prison in Big Spring, Howard County, Texas
 Bishop State Community College, a public, historically black community college in Alabama
 The British-Swiss Chamber of Commerce, an independent not-for-profit organisation